The 2020 Clemson Tigers men's soccer team represented Clemson University during the 2020 NCAA Division I men's soccer season.  The Tigers were led by head coach Mike Noonan, in his eleventh season.  They played home games at Riggs Field.  This was the team's 60th season playing organized men's college soccer and their 33rd playing in the Atlantic Coast Conference.

The teams' 2020 season was significantly impacted by the COVID-19 pandemic, which curtailed the fall season and caused the NCAA Tournament to be played in Spring 2021. The ACC was one of the only two conferences in men's soccer to play in the fall of 2020.  The ACC also held a mini-season during the spring of 2021.

The Tigers finished the fall season 8–2–1 and 3–2–1 in ACC play to finish in third place in the North Division.  They won the ACC Tournament by defeating Virginia Tech, Virginia and Pittsburgh in the final.  They finished the spring season 4–1–1 and 4–1–1 in ACC play, to finish in first place in the Atlantic Division.  They received the ACC's automatic bid to the NCAA Tournament after defeating Pittsburgh in a game for the bid.  As the first seed in the tournament, they defeated American in the Second Round before losing to Marshall in the Third Round on penalty kicks to end their season.

Background

The 2019 Clemson men's soccer team finished the season with a 18–2–2 overall record and a 6–1–1 ACC record.  The Tigers won the Atlantic Coast Conference Atlantic Division, and were seeded first–overall in the 2019 ACC Men's Soccer Tournament. They defeated Notre Dame and Pittsburgh before falling to Virginia in the final.  The Tigers received an at-large bid to the 2019 NCAA Division I Men's Soccer Tournament.  Seeded second-overall, they defeated Charlotte and Providence before losing to Stanford in the Quarterfinals.

At the end of the season, three Tigers men's soccer players wer selected in the 2020 MLS SuperDraft: Robbie Robinson, Tanner Dieterich, and Malick Mbaye.

Player movement

Players leaving

Players arriving

Squad

Roster
Updated March 21, 2021

Prior to the season, George Marks and James Brighton were named co-captains of the team.

Team management

Source:

Schedule

Source:

|-
!colspan=8 style=""| Fall Exhibition

|-
!colspan=7 style=""| Fall Regular season

|-
!colspan=7 style=""| ACC Tournament

|-
!colspan=7 style=""| Spring Exhibition

|-
!colspan=7 style=""| Spring Regular season

|-
!colspan=7 style=""| NCAA Automatic Bid Play-In

|-
!colspan=7 style=""| NCAA Tournament

Goals Record

Disciplinary Record

Awards and honors

2021 MLS Super Draft

Source:

Rankings

Fall 2020

Spring 2021

References

2020
2020 Atlantic Coast Conference men's soccer season
American men's college soccer teams 2020 season
2020 in sports in South Carolina
2020 NCAA Division I Men's Soccer Tournament participants
2020